Mimosa pudica (also called sensitive plant, sleepy plant, action plant, touch-me-not, or shameplant) is a creeping annual or perennial flowering plant of the pea/legume family Fabaceae. It is often grown for its curiosity value: the sensitive compound leaves fold inward and droop when touched or shaken and re-open a few minutes later. Mimosa pudica is not a carnivorous plant.  In the UK it has gained the Royal Horticultural Society's Award of Garden Merit.

The species is native to the Caribbean and South and Central America, but is now a pantropical weed, and can now be found in the Southern United States, South Asia, East Asia, Micronesia, Australia, South Africa, and West Africa as well. It is not shade-tolerant and is primarily found on soils with low nutrient concentrations.

Mimosa pudica is well known for its rapid plant movement. Like a number of other plant species, it undergoes changes in leaf orientation termed "sleep" or nyctinastic movement. The foliage closes during darkness and reopens in light. This was first studied by French scientist Jean-Jacques d'Ortous de Mairan. Due to Mimosa unique response to touch, it became an ideal plant for many experiments regarding plant habituation and memory.

Taxonomy
Mimosa pudica was first formally described by Carl Linnaeus in Species Plantarum in 1753.  The species epithet, pudica, is Latin for "bashful" or "shrinking", alluding to its shrinking reaction to contact.

The species is known by numerous common names including sensitive plant, humble plant, shameplant, and touch-me-not.

Description

The stem is erect in young plants but becomes creeping or trailing with age. It can hang very low and become floppy. The erect height of M. pudica usually reaches around ~30cm (~1ft).

The leaves are bipinnately compound, with one or two pinnae pairs, and 10–26 leaflets per pinna. The petioles are also prickly. Pedunculate (stalked) pale pink or purple flower heads arise from the leaf axils in mid-summer with more and more flowers as the plant gets older. A single flower survives for less than a day, and usually dies completely by the next day. Flowers of M. pudica are very brittle and soft. On close examination, it is seen that the floret petals are red in their upper part and the filaments are pink to lavender. Pollens are circular with approximately 8 microns in diameter.
The flowers are insect-pollinated and wind-pollinated. The seeds have hard seed coats which restrict germination and make osmotic pressure and soil acidity less significant hindrances. High temperatures are the main stimuli that cause the seeds to end dormancy.

The roots of Mimosa pudica create carbon disulfide, which prevents certain pathogenic and mycorrhizal fungi from growing within the plant's rhizosphere. This allows the formation of nodules on the roots of the plant that contain endosymbiotic diazotrophs, which fix atmospheric nitrogen and convert it into a form that is usable by the plant.

Mimosa pudica is a tetraploid (2n = 52).

Plant movement 

The leaflets also close when stimulated in other ways, such as touching, warming, blowing, and shaking, which are all encapsulated within mechanical or electrical stimulation. These types of movements have been termed seismonastic movements. This reflex may have evolved as a defense mechanism to disincentivize predators, or alternatively to shade the plant in order to reduce water loss due to evaporation. The main structure mechanistically responsible for the drooping of the leaves is the pulvinus. The stimulus is transmitted as an action potential from a stimulated leaflet to the leaflet's swollen base (pulvinus), and from there to the pulvini of the other leaflets, which run along the length of the leaf's rachis. The action potential then passes into the petiole, and finally to the large pulvinus at the end of the petiole, where the leaf attaches to the stem. The pulvini cells gain and lose turgor due to water moving in and out of these cells, and multiple ion concentrations play a role in the manipulation of water movement.

The Mimosa’s leaves, similar to Venus Fly Trap’s trigger hairs, are hypersensitive to touch. In line with the touch-sensing function used for tasks such as for defense or nutrient maintenance, these parts have mechanoreceptors linked to mechanosensitive channels that can conduct calcium ions and indirectly relative anions upon touch stimulation, giving rise to depolarization, the initiation of an action potential (AP). They also have voltage-sensitive potassium channels that promote hyperpolarization and turgor formation. Such sensitive plants fire all-or-nothing type APs similar to those seen in animals.

This movement of folding inwards is energetically costly for the plant and also interferes with the process of photosynthesis.

Distribution and habitat
Mimosa pudica is native to the tropical Americas. It can also be found in Asian countries such as Singapore, Bangladesh, Thailand, India, Nepal, Indonesia, Taiwan, Malaysia, the Philippines, Vietnam, Cambodia, Laos, Japan, and Sri Lanka. It has been introduced to many other regions and is regarded as an invasive species in Tanzania, South and Southeast Asia, and many Pacific islands. It is regarded as invasive in parts of Australia and is a declared weed in the Northern Territory, and Western Australia although not naturalized there. Control is recommended in Queensland.

It has also been introduced to Uganda, Ghana, Nigeria, Seychelles, Mauritius and East Asia but is not regarded as invasive in those places. In the United States, it grows in Louisiana, Florida, Hawaii, Tennessee, Virginia, Maryland, Puerto Rico, Texas, Alabama, Mississippi, North Carolina, Georgia, the territory of Guam, and the Virgin Islands.

Predators
Mimosa pudica has several natural predators, such as the spider mite and mimosa webworm. Both of these insects wrap the leaflets in webs that hinder the responsive closing. Webbed leaves are noticeable as they become brown fossilized remnants after an attack. The Mimosa webworm is composed of two generations that arise at different seasons. This makes prevention difficult and requires proper timing of insecticides to avoid aiding other predators. Once the larvae become steel-gray moths, they are harmless to the plant but lay more eggs.

Agricultural impact
The species can be a weed for tropical crops, particularly when fields are hand-cultivated. Crops it tends to affect are corn, coconuts, tomatoes, cotton, coffee, bananas, soybeans, papaya, and sugar cane. Dry thickets may become a fire hazard. In some cases it has become a forage plant although the variety in Hawaii is reported to be toxic to livestock.

In addition, Mimosa pudica can change the physico-chemical properties of the soil it invades; total nitrogen and potassium, for example, have been seen to increase in significantly invaded areas.

Phytoremediation 
Thirty-six native Thai plant species were tested to see which conducted the most phytoremediation of arsenic polluted soils caused by tin mines. Mimosa pudica was one of the four species that significantly extracted and bioaccumulated the pollutant into its leaves. Other studies have found that Mimosa pudica extracts heavy metals such as copper, lead, tin, and zinc from polluted soils. This allows for the soil to gradually return to less toxic compositions.

Nitrogen fixation 
Mimosa pudica can form root nodules that are habitable by nitrogen-fixing bacteria. The bacteria are able to convert atmospheric nitrogen, which plants cannot use, into a form that plants can use. This trait is common among plants in the family Fabaceae. Nitrogen is a vital element for both plant growth and reproduction. Nitrogen is also essential for plant photosynthesis because it is a component of chlorophyll. Nitrogen fixation contributes nitrogen to the plant and to the soil surrounding the plant's roots.

Mimosa pudica'''s ability to fix nitrogen may have arisen in conjunction with the evolution of nitrogen-fixing bacteria. Nitrogen fixation is an adaptive trait that has transformed the parasitic relationship between the bacteria and plants into a mutualistic relationship. The shifting dynamics of this relationship are demonstrated by the corresponding improvement of various symbiotic characteristics in both Mimosa pudica and bacteria. These traits include enhanced "competitive nodulation, nodule development, intracellular infection, and bacteroid persistence".

As much as 60% of the nitrogen found in Mimosa pudica can be attributed to the fixation of N2 by bacteria. Burkholderia phymatum STM815T and Cupriavidus taiwanensis LMG19424T are beta-rhizobial strains of diazotrophs that are highly effective at fixing nitrogen when coupled with M. pudica. Burkholderia is also shown to be a strong symbiont of Mimosa pudica in nitrogen-poor soils in regions like Cerrado and Caatinga.

Cultivation

In cultivation, this plant is most often grown as an indoor annual, but is also grown for groundcover. Propagation is generally by seed. Mimosa pudica grows most effectively in nutrient poor soil that allows for substantial water drainage. However, this plant is also shown to grow in scalped and eroded subsoils. Typically, disrupted soil is necessary in order for M. pudica to become established in an area. Additionally, the plant is shade intolerant and frost-sensitive, meaning that it does not tolerate low levels of light or cold temperatures. Mimosa pudica does not compete for resources with larger foliage or forest canopy undergrowth.

In temperate zones it must be grown under protection, where the temperature falls below .

Chemical constituentsMimosa pudica contains the toxic alkaloid mimosine, which has been found to also have antiproliferative and apoptotic effects. The extracts of Mimosa pudica immobilize the filariform larvae of Strongyloides stercoralis in less than one hour. Aqueous extracts of the roots of the plant have shown significant neutralizing effects in the lethality of the venom of the monocled cobra (Naja kaouthia). It appears to inhibit the myotoxicity and enzyme activity of cobra venom.Mimosa pudica demonstrates both antioxidant and antibacterial properties. This plant has also been demonstrated to be non-toxic in brine shrimp lethality tests, which suggests that M. pudica has low levels of toxicity. Chemical analysis has shown that Mimosa pudica contains various compounds, including "alkaloids, flavonoid C-glycosides, sterols, terenoids, tannins, saponin and fatty acids".Parasuraman S, Ching TH, Leong CH, Banik U (2019) Antidiabetic and antihyperlipidemic effects of a methanolic extract of Mimosa pudica (Fabaceae) in diabetic rats, Egyptian Journal of Basic and Applied Sciences, 6:1, 137-148, DOI: 10.1080/2314808X.2019.1681660 The roots of the plant have been shown to contain up to 10% tannin. A substance similar to adrenaline has been found within the plant's leaves. Mimosa pudica's seeds produce mucilage made up of D-glucuronic acid and D-xylose. Additionally, extracts of M. pudica have been shown to contain crocetin-dimethylester, tubulin, and green-yellow fatty oils. A new class of phytohormone turgorines, which are derivatives of gallic acid 4-O-(β-D-glucopyranosyl-6'-sulfate), have been discovered within the plant.

The nitrogen-fixing properties of Mimosa pudica contribute to a high nitrogen content within the plant's leaves. The leaves of M. pudica also contain a wide range of carbon to mineral content, as well as a large variation in 13C values. The correlation between these two numbers suggests that significant ecological adaptation has occurred among the varieties of M. pudica in Brazil.

The roots contain sac-like structures that release organic and organosulfur compounds including SO2, methylsulfinic acid, pyruvic acid, lactic acid, ethanesulfinic acid, propane sulfinic acid, 2-mercaptoaniline, S-propyl propane 1-thiosulfinate, and thioformaldehyde, an elusive and highly unstable compound never before reported to be emitted by a plant.

Research with Mimosa pudica

Wilhelm Pfeffer, a German botanist during the 17th century, used Mimosa in one of the first experiments testing plant habituation. Further experimentation was done in 1965, when Holmes and Gruenberg discovered that Mimosa could distinguish between two stimuli, a water drop and a finger touch. Their findings also demonstrated that the habituated behavior was not due to fatigue since the leaf-folding response returned when another stimulus was presented.

Electrical signaling experiments were conducted on Mimosa pudica, where 1.3–1.5 volts and 2–10 µC of charge acted as the threshold to induce closing of the leaves. This topic was further explored in 2017 by neuroscientist Greg Gage who connected Mimosa pudica to Dionaea muscipula, better known as the Venus flytrap. Both plants had electrical wiring connecting them and were linked to an electrocardiogram. The results showed how causing an action potential in one plant led to an electrical response, causing both plants to respond.

Experiments were made on how anesthetics for animals could affect Mimosa pudica. These experiments showed that anesthetics cause narcosis of the motor organs, which was observed by the application of volatile ether, chloroform, carbon tetrachloride, hydrogen sulfide, ammonia, formaldehyde, and other substances. In a preclinical study, methanolic extract of Mimosa pudica showed a significant antidiabetic and antihyperlipidemic activities in streptozotocin-induced diabetic rats.

In 2018, two research groups from the Universities of Palermo (Italy) and Lugano (Switzerland) demonstrated the feasibility of using such plant as a building block for creating plant-based controllable two-color displays, exploiting air jets instead of electrical or touch-based stimulation.

In a 2022 study in the journal Nature Communications, researchers used simultaneous recordings of cytosolic Ca2+ and electrical signals to show that rapid changes in Ca2+ coupled with action and variation potentials trigger rapid movements in wounded M. pudica. Moreover, they found that disrupting cytosolic Ca2+ dynamics through pharmacological manipulation or CRISPR-Cas9 genome editing made M. pudica more vulnerable to herbivorous insect attacks. The findings suggest that these rapid movements based on propagating Ca2+ and electrical signals serve a protective role for the plant against insect herbivory.

Habitual learning

Plants that live in low light environments have less of an opportunity for photosynthesis compared to plants that live in high light environments where sunshine isn't a problem. When the Mimosa plant folds in its leaves as a defensive mechanism there is an energetic trade off, since folding its leaves reduces the amount of photosynthesis the Mimosa can perform during the closed period by 40%, but provides a rapid defensive mechanism against potentially harmful predators or external stimulation.

In an experiment, researcher Monica Gagliano wanted to study if Mimosa plants in low light conditions would have a greater potential for learning than those grown in high light, since the low light plants were already in low energy environments and folding their leaves would be more energetically costly to the plant. The simplest form of learning is the ability of an organism to have a certain level of sensitivity to the environment that allows the organism to respond to potentially harmful stimuli as well as the capability to learn and filter out irrelevant stimuli (habituation) or increase the response due to a learned stimulus (sensitization).

Researchers predicted the low light plants would have adapted to have faster habitual learning capabilities so they could filter out unharmful stimuli to increase their energy production. Plants were either grown in high light or low light conditions. The plants were stimulated by being dropped from 15 cm for either a single drop, or consecutive training sessions where the plants were repeatedly dropped. To test that the plants were suppressing their leaf folding reflex from habitual learning and not from exhaustion, the plants were shaken as a novel stimuli to see if the plants would fold their leaves (dishabituation test). The first group was tested to see if short term memory was enough for plants to modify their behaviour.

Regardless of what light group the plants were in, one drop was not enough for the plants to learn to ignore the stimulation. For the groups that were dropped repetitively, the plants stopped folding their leaves and were even fully open after a drop before the end of the trainings. The low light plants learned faster to ignore the dropping stimulation than the high light plants. When the plants were shaken, they responded immediately by folding their leaves, which suggests that the plants were not ignoring the dropping stimulation due to exhaustion. This research suggests that the Mimosa has the capability for habitual learning and memory storage and that Mimosa plants grown in low light conditions have faster learning mechanisms so they can reduce the amount of time their leaves are unnecessarily closed to optimize energy production.

Given that plants lack a central nervous system, the means by which they send and store information is not obvious. There are two hypotheses for memory in Mimosa, neither of which has yet been generally accepted. The first is that when the plant is stimulated, it releases a surge of calcium ions that are sensed by the protein calmodulin. The relationship between the ions and proteins are thought to stimulate voltage gated ion channels which cause electrical signals, which could be the base of plant long term memory. The other hypothesis is that plant cells act similarly to neural cells by creating electrical gradients by opening and closing ion channels and passing it along cell junctions. The information passed along can control which genes are turned on and which genes are turned off, which could be a mode for long term memory.

See alsoCodariocalyx motorius''
Venus flytrap

References

External links

 View occurrences of Mimosa pudica in the Biodiversity Heritage Library
 "Sensitive Plant" page by Dr. T. Ombrello
 Fact Sheet from the Queensland (Australia) Department of Agriculture, Fisheries and Forestry
 Page about nyctinasty and leaf movement of Mimosa pudica by John Hewitson
 1 and 2
 

pudica
Flora of South America
Neotropical realm flora
Garden plants of Central America
Garden plants of South America
House plants
Plants used in Ayurveda
Plants described in 1753
Taxa named by Carl Linnaeus
Articles containing video clips
Subshrubs